Acrobasopsis is a monotypic snout moth genus in the subfamily Phycitinae described by Hans Georg Amsel in 1958. It contains the species Acrobasopsis acrobasella, described by Hans Rebel in 1927, which is found in Egypt and Israel.

The larvae feed on Tamarix species.

References

Phycitinae
Monotypic moth genera
Moths of Africa
Moths of Asia
Pyralidae genera
Taxa named by Hans Georg Amsel